"As We May Think" is a 1945 essay by Vannevar Bush which has been described as visionary and influential, anticipating many aspects of information society. It was first published in The Atlantic in July 1945 and republished in an abridged version in September 1945—before and after the atomic bombings of Hiroshima and Nagasaki. Bush expresses his concern for the direction of scientific efforts toward destruction, rather than understanding, and explicates a desire for a sort of collective memory machine with his concept of the memex that would make knowledge more accessible, believing that it would help fix these problems. Through this machine, Bush hoped to transform an information explosion into a knowledge explosion.

Concept creation
The article was a reworked and expanded version of Bush's essay "Mechanization and the Record" (1939). Here, he described a machine that would combine lower level technologies to achieve a higher level of organized knowledge (like human memory processes). Shortly after the publication of this essay, Bush coined the term "memex" in a letter written to the editor of Fortune magazine. That letter became the body of "As We May Think", which added only an introduction and conclusion. As described, Bush's memex was based on what was thought, at the time, to be advanced technology of the future: ultra high resolution microfilm reels, coupled to multiple screen viewers and cameras, by electromechanical controls. The memex, in essence, reflects a library of collective knowledge stored in a piece of machinery described in his essay as "a piece of furniture". The Atlantic publication of Bush's article was followed, in the September 10, 1945, issue of Life magazine, by a reprint that showed illustrations of the proposed memex desk and automatic typewriter. Bush also discussed other technologies such as dry photography and microphotography where he elaborates on the potentialities of their future use. For example, Bush states in his essay that:

Concept realization
"As We May Think" predicted (to some extent) many kinds of technology invented after its publication, including hypertext, personal computers, the Internet, the World Wide Web, speech recognition, and online encyclopedias such as Wikipedia: "Wholly new forms of encyclopedias will appear, ready-made with a mesh of associative trails running through them, ready to be dropped into the memex and there amplified." Bush envisioned the ability to retrieve several articles or pictures on one screen, with the possibility of writing comments that could be stored and recalled together. He believed people would create links between related articles, thus mapping the thought process and path of each user and saving it for others to experience. Wikipedia is one example of how this vision has in part been realized, allowing elements of an article to reference other related topics. A user's browser history maps the trails of possible paths of interaction, although this is typically available only to the user that created it.
Bush's article also laid the foundation for new media. Doug Engelbart came across the essay shortly after its publication, and keeping the memex in mind, he began work that would eventually result in the invention of the mouse, the word processor, the hyperlink and concepts of new media for which these groundbreaking inventions were merely enabling technologies.

Today, storage has greatly surpassed the level imagined by Vannevar Bush,  On the other hand, it still uses methods of indexing of information which Bush described as artificial: This description resembles popular file systems of modern computer operating systems (FAT, NTFS, ext3 when used without hard links and symlinks, etc.), which do not easily enable associative indexing as imagined by Bush.

Outlook in the use of science
Bush urges that scientists should turn to the massive task of creating more efficient accessibility to our fluctuating store of knowledge. For years inventions have extended people's physical powers rather than the powers of their mind. He argues that the instruments are at hand which, if properly developed, will give society access to and command over the inherited knowledge of the ages. The perfection of these pacific instruments, he suggests, should be the first objective of our scientists.

Through this process, society would be able to focus and evolve past the existing knowledge rather than looping through infinite calculations. We should be able to pass the tedious work of numbers to machines and work on the intricate theory which puts them best to use. If humanity were able to obtain the "privilege of forgetting the manifold things he does not need to have immediately at hand, with some assurance that he can find them again if proven important" only then "will mathematics be practically effective in bringing the growing knowledge of atomistic to the useful solution of the advanced problems of chemistry, metallurgy, and biology". To exemplify the importance of this concept, consider the process involved in 'simple' shopping: "Every time a charge sale is made, there are a number of things to be done. The inventory needs to be revised, the salesman needs to be given credit for the sale, the general accounts need an entry, and most important, the customer needs to be charged." Due to the convenience of the store's central device which rapidly manage thousands of these transactions, the employees may focus on the essential aspects of the department such as sales and advertising.

Indeed, as of today, "science has provided the swiftest communication between individuals; it has provided a record of ideas and has enabled man to manipulate and to make extracts from that record so that knowledge evolves and endures throughout the life of a race rather than of an individual". Improved technology has become an extension of our capabilities, much as how external hard drives function for computers so it may reserve more memory for more practical tasks.

Another significant role of practicality in technology is the method of association and selection. "There may be millions of fine thoughts, and the account of the experience on which they are based, all encased within stone walls of acceptable architectural form; but if the scholar can get at only one a week by diligent search, his synthesis are not likely to keep up with the current scene." Bush believes that the tools available in his time lacked this feature, but noted the emergence and development of such ideas such as the Memex, a cross referencing system.

Bush concludes his essay by stating that:

Outline
Many scientists, especially physicists, get new duties during the War. Now, after the war, they need new duties.

Section 1: The use of Science has improved tremendously in many ways for humans. The knowledge of science has grown considerably. However, the way we manage knowledge has remained the same for centuries. We are no longer able to access the breadth of scientific breakthroughs. Alternatively, the technology has matured greatly and allows us to now produce complicated, yet cheap and dependable machines.

Section 2: Science is really useful. However, in order to have it to be very efficient and useful it should not only be stored but also be frequently consulted and enhanced. In the future Bush predicts humans will be able to store human writings in a small room with the use of photography and microfilm.

Section 3: Using the latest advances of speech recording and stenography, we will soon be able to make printing immediate. The advancement of photography is not going to stop. Further, simple repetitive tasks, like mathematic problems, can be delegated to machines. Electrical machines will be the advancement of arithmetical computation.

Section 4: There is more to the scientific reasoning than just arithmetic. There are a few machines that are not used for arithmetic, partly due to the market’s needs. Solving higher mathematics require other repetitive processes of thought to be mechanized.

Section 5: A machine could be used anywhere where there is logical thought process. At this moment we do not have the necessary tools for the selection (the key to utilize science) of knowledge. One of the best forms of selection is illustrated by the automatic telephone exchange.

Section 6: There is a problem with selection. The main problem of it is the deficiency of the indexing systems. When data is recorded and put into storage, it is usually filed alphabetically or numerically. The human mind works differently. It works according to association. Instead of using selection by indexing, selection by association may be mechanized. Thus, improving the permanence and clarity of the items stored. The memex is a device that could store information and communication (large memory). Some things that can be entered are, newspaper and books. The user is also able to find a particular book as he or she taps on its code on the keyboard. The codes that are frequently used to call forth pages are mnemonic and its possible to browse these pages at different speeds.

Section 7: The main feature of the memex is the ability to tie two things together at will. In other words, to be able to associate two arbitrary items when wanted. The user is also able to build a trail, in which they name it, insert a name into the code book, and then taps it out on the keyboard. At any time, the user is able to view two items at the same time, parallel viewing. It is also possible to pass items to another memex.

Section 8: The trails made can be shared with others and can also be published, like an encyclopedia (many more new forms are to appear). Soon we will be able to establish some kind of direct connection with absorbing material of the record with one of our senses, tactilely, orally, and visually. It would be great for humans to be able to analyze present issues. As of now, science has been applied to live better, as well as for destruction. Possibly we may be able to apply the record to become wiser.

Critical opinion
"As We May Think" has turned out to be a visionary and influential essay. In their introduction to a paper discussing information literacy as a discipline, Johnston and Webber write 

Indeed, Bush was very concerned with information overload inhibiting the research efforts of scientists. His scientist, operating under conditions of "information explosion" and requiring respite from the tide of scientific documents could be construed as a nascent image of the "Information Literate Person" in an information saturated society.

See also
 Timeline of hypertext technology
 Douglas Engelbart

References

External links

 
 Video archive of Oct 12-13 1995 MIT/Brown Symposium on the 50th Anniversary of "As We May Think"
 "As We May Think" - A Celebration of Vannevar Bush's 1945 Vision, at Brown University

Futurology books
1945 essays
Library science publications
History of computing
History of the Internet
Human–computer interaction
Hypertext
Works originally published in The Atlantic (magazine)
Texts related to the history of the Internet